Never Take Sweets from a Stranger (US Never Take Candy from a Stranger) is a 1960 British film, directed by Cyril Frankel and released by Hammer Film Productions. The screenplay was developed by John Hunter from the play The Pony Trap by Roger Garis. It stars Patrick Allen, Gwen Watford, Janina Faye as their victimised daughter and Felix Aylmer, the latter being cast notably against type. The twin themes are paedophilia and the child sexual abuse, and the way in which those with sufficient pull can corrupt and manipulate the legal system to evade responsibility for their actions. The film is regarded as bold and uncompromising for its time.

Plot
The film is set in a small Canadian town to which the British Carter family (Peter, Sally and 9-year-old daughter Jean) have just moved, following Peter's appointment as school principal. One night Jean appears restless and disturbed, and confides to her parents that earlier that day while playing in a local wood, she and her friend, Lucille, went into the house of an elderly man who asked them to remove their clothes and dance naked before him in return for some candy, which they did and Jean doesn't believe they did anything wrong. But her parents are appalled by what they hear and decide to file a complaint. The accused man, Clarence Olderberry Sr., is however the doyen of the wealthiest, most highly regarded and influential family in town and matters conspire to turn against the Carters as the townspeople start to close rank against the newcomers. The police chief casts doubt on Jean's story, while Olderberry's son warns the Carters that if they pursue the matter through the legal system, he will ensure that Jean's evidence and trustworthiness will be torn to shreds in court.

When the case comes to trial, it is with an obviously stacked jury and in an atmosphere of extreme hostility towards the Carters. As threatened, the Defense Counsel proceeds to question Jean in a harrowing, bullying manner which leaves her confused, frightened and giving the impression of an unreliable witness. Inevitably Olderberry is acquitted.

The Carters realise that there can be no future for them in the town, and make plans to leave. Shortly before their departure, Jean rides her bicycle and meets Lucille. They are in the woods again when they see Olderberry approaching them, offering them a bag of sweets. He grabs hold of Jean's bicycle. This time forewarned, the girls run away in panic and come to a lake, dropping Lucille's shopping bag on the way, and they find a rowboat in which they attempt to flee to the other side of the lake. The boat is however still moored to the lakeshore, and Olderberry begins to pull it back in.

Meanwhile, Jean's bicycle is found and delivered to the police. The police chief finds out that Olderberry Sr. is missing. Suspecting foul play, the police search the woods for the missing girls, with Peter and Olderberry Jr. accompanying them. The police find Lucille's shopping bag. Olderberry Jr. finds his father's hat and attempts to hide it, but Peter catches him. Soon afterwards the boat is found. The SAR dogs lead the police to a cabin, where Lucille is lying dead on the floor, and Olderberry Sr. is there, behaving strangely, his clothes are disarrayed, with an insane expression on his face. Olderberry Jr. gazes shocked at his father, realising the girls were telling the truth.

While Sally waits anxiously at home, word has spread all over town about the search for the girls and Olderberry. Many of the town residents gather in front of the Carters' house. The police bring Peter and Jean. Peter tells Sally that Jean managed to get away unharmed from Olderberry Sr. and was found wandering in the wood on the other side of the lake. Sally asks what happened to Lucille. Before Peter can answer, Olderberry Jr. approaches them, overwhelmed with guilt and remorse. He whimpers and repeatedly exclaims that his father killed Lucille while the crowd listens to him silently. The police take him away and the crowd disperses.

Cast
 Patrick Allen as Peter Carter
 Gwen Watford as Sally Carter
 Janina Faye as Jean Carter
 Felix Aylmer as Clarence Olderberry Sr
 Niall MacGinnis as Defense Counsel
 Michael Gwynn as Prosecutor
 Alison Leggatt as Martha
 Bill Nagy (actor) as Clarence Olderberry Jr
 MacDonald Parke as Judge
 Estelle Brody as Eunice Kalliduke
 Robert Arden as Tom Demarest
 Frances Green as Lucille
 John Bloomfield as Foreman of Jury

Reception
On its original release, the film made little impact at the box-office and its press was mainly negative. This was partly because at the time the crime of paedophilia wasn't frankly discussed. Merely to produce a film dealing openly with the question was deemed sordid and distasteful. Another hindrance to commercial success was that the film was far from easy to categorise, so it was difficult to market to any specific film audience demographic. In terms of genre it had elements of suspense, horror, courtroom drama and social commentary, but did not fit neatly into any general classification. In addition some of the publicity chosen for the film, (such as a promotional poster with an image of armed police with tracker dogs, and the tagline "A nightmare manhunt for maniac prowler!"), was misleading, as it implied a fugitive-on-the-run chase thriller. Hammer Studios boss James Carreras later commented: "Message pictures? I tried one: 'Never Take Sweets from a Stranger'.  Nobody bought it.  I'm not an artist.  I'm a businessman."<ref>"London film executive makes money on thrillers" Reading Eagle, 6 July 1961. Retrieved 25 July 2010</ref> The film did garner some positive reviews, with Variety for example saying: "Gwen Watford and Patrick Allen, as the distraught parents, and Alison Leggatt, as a wise, understanding grandmother, lead a cast which is directed with complete sensitivity by Cyril Frankel. Both Watford and Allen are completely credible while Leggatt, well-served by John Hunter's script, is outstanding.  Aylmer, who doesn't utter a word throughout the film, gives a terrifying acute study of crumbling evil." The film quickly disappeared from view, and for many years remained little-known and rarely screened. Indeed no indication can be found that it was ever shown on British television.

By the 1990s, at a time when a general reassessment and re-evaluation of Hammer's back catalogue, including its more obscure entries, was under way, critics and aficionados revisited Never Take Sweets from a Stranger with fresh eyes, and found a brave, honest and in some ways groundbreaking film. In 1994, Hammer denizen Christopher Lee noted: "Never Take Sweets from a Stranger, an excellent film, was decades ahead of its time." Its reputation has continued to improve, and in 2010 the film made its first appearance on DVD, along with five other elusive and sought-after Hammer rarities, in a US triple DVD collection called Icons of Suspense.
In 2021, 'Powerhouse Films' released the restored Blu-ray version, along with many extras, interviews, and pdf material.

Location filming
Despite its nominal Canadian setting, exterior filming for Never Take Sweets from a Stranger'' took place in Burnham and Black Park in Wexham, Buckinghamshire. Black Park was featured in numerous Hammer productions due to its atmospheric appearance on film and its proximity to Hammer's Bray Studios base.

Alternate dialogue
Aside from the alternative title, there is some mild swearing in the original British 'Sweets' prints. It features a line from Patrick Allen's character around the 10-minute mark: "If he touched her, I swear I'll kill the bastard." In the U.S. 'Candy' prints (and the 2010 Icons of Suspense DVD), the word "swine" is used instead on the audio, also recorded by Allen, but the picture remains the same, and he can clearly still be seen to say "bastard".

References

External links 
 
 
 Never Take Sweets from a Stranger at Eccentric Cinema

1960 films
1960s thriller drama films
British black-and-white films
British films based on plays
British thriller drama films
Columbia Pictures films
1960s English-language films
Films about child sexual abuse
Films directed by Cyril Frankel
Films scored by Elisabeth Lutyens
Films set in Canada
Hammer Film Productions films
1960 drama films
Films shot in Buckinghamshire
1960s British films